The Slovenian football champions are the winners of the highest league of association football in Slovenia, PrvaLiga. Also known by the abbreviation 1. SNL, PrvaLiga is contested on a round-robin basis and the championship is awarded to the club that finishes top of the league at the end of the season. The league was established after the independence of Slovenia in 1991, originally containing 21 clubs. Before that, Maribor, Nafta Lendava and Olimpija were the only Slovenian teams who participated in the Yugoslav top division, Yugoslav First League, between the end of World War II in 1945 and the breakup of Yugoslavia in 1991. While being a part of the Yugoslav football system, most of the Slovenian clubs competed for the title of regional champions in the Slovenian Republic Football League. However, the republic league was officially the third tier of football most of the time and the competition was usually without the top Slovenian clubs, who played in the Yugoslav Second League or the country's top division.

Following the independence of Slovenia, the Football Association of Slovenia separated from the Football Association of Yugoslavia and created their own football competitions. For the first time in history, top Slovenian clubs competed in the newly formed Slovenian football league for the title of Slovenian champion. Of the founding clubs in the PrvaLiga, only Celje and Maribor have never been relegated as of the 2021–22 season. The format and the number of clubs in the league has changed over time, ranging from 21 clubs in the first season to 10 clubs in its present form. The top clubs at the end of the season are awarded a qualifying spot in the UEFA Champions League and the UEFA Europa Conference League, with the bottom one being relegated to the Slovenian Second League, 2. SNL.

Olimpija won the first title. They had a long tradition of playing in the Yugoslav top division and their squad was still composed of players from that era. Olimpija dominated the league and won a further three championships before Gorica won their first in the 1995–96 season. Following Gorica's success, Maribor won their first championship in 1997. This started a record-breaking streak of seven successive league championships which came to an end when Gorica won their second title in the 2003–04 season. The club from Nova Gorica went on to win an additional two titles, becoming the third club to win three consecutive championships. During the 2006–07 season, Domžale, a club that played in the Slovenian second division four seasons earlier, won their first title, a feat they repeated the next season. Between 2009 and 2019, Maribor became a major force in Slovenian football for the second time, winning eight out of eleven championships in this period. In 2020 and 2021, Celje and Mura won their first titles, respectively.

Maribor is the most successful club; they have won the championship 16 times, more than all other clubs combined. Seven of Maribor's titles came during the late 1990s and early 2000s when the club was led alternately by managers Bojan Prašnikar, Ivo Šušak and Matjaž Kek. Between 2009 and 2013, Darko Milanič led the club to four championships. In 2017 and 2019, during his second spell with Maribor, Milanič won additional two titles with the club. Olimpija won four titles, all in successive years between 1992 and 1995. In addition, Olimpija is the only Slovenian football champion no longer in existence, having been dissolved by the end of the 2004–05 season when they filed for bankruptcy. Tied with four championships is Gorica who won their first title in 1996 and an additional three in successive years between 2004 and 2006. Domžale and Olimpija Ljubljana have won two titles each, followed by Koper, Celje and Mura with one title each. Maribor has won the Slovenian version of the double the most; they have won the league and cup four times in the same season. The current champions are Maribor, who won the 2021–22 edition.

Champions
Correct as of the 2021–22 Slovenian PrvaLiga season. For the information on the season in progress, see 2022–23 Slovenian PrvaLiga.

Total titles won
Correct as of the 2021–22 Slovenian PrvaLiga season. As of 2022, a total of eight different clubs have been Slovenian football champions during the 31 PrvaLiga seasons.

Footnotes

References
General

Specific

Champions
Slovenia